The Seetalhorn is a mountain of the Swiss Pennine Alps, overlooking Grächen in the canton of Valais. With an elevation of 3,037 m, it is the highest point of the ski area of Grächen.

References

External links
Seetalhorn on Hikr

Mountains of the Alps
Alpine three-thousanders
Mountains of Valais
Mountains of Switzerland